Saint Augustine in His Study may refer to:

 Saint Augustine in His Study (Botticelli, Uffizi)
 Saint Augustine in His Study (Botticelli, Ognissanti)
 Saint Augustine in His Study (Carpaccio)